Sandy Patricia Abi-Elias (born 10 May 1997) is a former footballer who played as a forward.

Abi-Elias played for various youth clubs in England, most notably Arsenal and Chelsea. She made her senior debut in 2014 with Watford, before playing for Bristol Academy, Swindon Town, and Keynsham Town.

Born in England, Abi-Elias is of Lebanese descent; she represented Lebanon internationally in 2018.

Club career

Youth 
Abi-Elias started her youth career at Fulham in 2007, before moving to AFC Wimbledon in 2011. After one year, Abi-Elias moved to Arsenal, winning the 2012–13 FA Girls Youth Cup, before joining Chelsea in 2013, staying there one year.

Senior 
In 2014 Abi-Elias began her senior career at Watford, playing during the 2014–15 season. In 2015 she moved to Bristol Academy, before joining Swindon Town in 2016. After one season at the club, Abi-Elias moved to Keynsham Town, playing there during the 2017–18 season.

International career 
Abi-Elias made her senior international debut for Lebanon on 28 November 2018, in an AFC Women's Olympic qualifying match against Iran; Lebanon lost 8–0.

Personal life 
Born in Isleworth, England, Abi-Elias studied at Teddington School in Teddington, London between 2007 and 2013. In 2011, while in Year 9, Abi-Elias was awarded Football Player of the Year (Girl). Between 2013 and 2015, Abi-Elias studied BTEC Level 3 Sport and Exercise at Kingston College, while playing for the college's women's football academy. In 2015 Abi-Elias studied at the University of Bath, with a BA in Sport and Social Sciences.

Honours 
Arsenal
 FA Girls Youth Cup: 2012–13

See also
 List of Lebanon women's international footballers

References

External links
 
 

1997 births
Living people
Footballers from Isleworth
English people of Lebanese descent
Sportspeople of Lebanese descent
Lebanese women's footballers
English women's footballers
Women's association football forwards
Fulham L.F.C. players
AFC Wimbledon Ladies players
Arsenal W.F.C. players
Chelsea F.C. Women players
Watford F.C. Women players
Bristol Academy W.F.C. players
Swindon Town W.F.C. players
Keynsham Town L.F.C. players
FA Women's National League players
Lebanon women's international footballers
Alumni of Kingston College (England)
Alumni of the University of Bath